Gopalganj is a town in Gopalgonj District in the Dhaka Division of Bangladesh.
It serves as the headquarters of Gopalgonj District and Gopalganj Sadar Upazila.

References

External links
Gopalganj – Banglapedia

Gopalganj District, Bangladesh